Lance Naik Albert Ekka, PVC (27 December 1942 – 3 December 1971) was a soldier in the Indian Army. He was martyred in action in the Battle  of Gangasagar, during the Indo-Pakistan War of 1971. He was posthumously awarded the Param Vir Chakra, India's highest award for valour in the face of the enemy.

Early life
Albert Ekka was born on 27 December 1942, in village Zari in Gumla, Jharkhand. His parents were Julius Ekka and Mariam Ekka. Ekka's family belonged to an Adivasi tribe . Hunting was a common sport among the Adivasis, and Ekka was interested in it from his childhood. With his experience of hunting in jungles, he was able to be a better soldier with his skilful use of ground and movements. As he grew, Ekka developed interest for the army, and was enrolled in the Bihar Regiment on 27 December 1962.

Military career
After the 14th Battalion of the Brigade of the Guards was raised in January 1968, Ekka was transferred to that unit. He saw action in counter-insurgency operations while in the North East. During the preparations anticipation of Indo-Pakistani War of 1971, Ekka was promoted to Lance Naik.

Battle of Gangasagar
As the war broke out, 14 Guards was attached to the IV Corps. The high ground around the railway station was their main defence, followed by anti-tank and anti-personnel mines. During a patrol, Pakistani troops were found moving on the railway tracks. Soon two companies of the battalion attacked the enemy positions along the track.

Citation
The Param Vir Chakra citation on the Official Indian Army Website reads as follows:

Legacy

Lance-Naik Albert Ekka was posthumously awarded India's highest wartime gallantry award, the Param Vir Chakra. In 2000, on the occasion of 50th Republic day, the Government of India issued a postal stamp in his memory. The son of Jharkhand was honoured by naming the major intersection in front of Firayalal store in Ranchi as Albert Ekka Chowk, which also bears his statue. A block (sub-district) in Gumla has also been created in his name - Albert Ekka (Jari) block. In Tripura there is a eco park Albert Ekka Park named after him for his action to save Agartala from Pakistan during 1971 Indo-Pak war.

References

Further reading

1942 births
1971 deaths
Recipients of the Param Vir Chakra
Indian military personnel of the Indo-Pakistani War of 1971
People from Gumla district